The Journal of Psychohistory is a journal established in 1973 in the field of psychohistory, edited by Lloyd deMause and published by the Institute for Psychohistory (IP) . The journal has been originally published as History of Childhood Quarterly and since 1976 as The Journal of Psychohistory.

The journal aims to provide "a new psychological view of world events — past and present". The journal is published quarterly and contains subjects such as childhood and the family (especially child abuse), psychobiography with extensive childhood material, political psychology and psychological studies of anthropology.

References

External links 
 Journal home page

Psychoanalysis journals
Sociology journals
Works about child abuse
History of psychology journals
Publications established in 1973